The speckled sole, Peltorhamphus latus, is a righteye flounder of the family Pleuronectidae, found around New Zealand and Norfolk Island in enclosed waters less than 55 m in depth.  Their length is up to 17 cm.

References
 
 Tony Ayling & Geoffrey Cox, Collins Guide to the Sea Fishes of New Zealand,  (William Collins Publishers Ltd, Auckland, New Zealand 1982) 

Pleuronectidae
Fish described in 1972